Chal Gharu (also Romanized as Chal Gharū) is a village in Zaz-e Gharbi Rural District, Zaz va Mahru District, Aligudarz County, Lorestan Province, Iran. At the 2006 census, its population was 56, in 11 families.

References 

Towns and villages in Aligudarz County